Geoffrey A. Jehle is a professor in Economics at Vassar College. And also, he serves as faculty in the Program in Economic Policy Management (PEPM) at School of International and Public Affairs, Columbia University. Jehle's work is on microeconomic theory and international trade but he is perhaps best known for the textbook Advanced microeconomic theory written jointly with Philip J. Reny.

Selected publications

References

21st-century American economists
Vassar College faculty
Living people
Year of birth missing (living people)